Stephen James Price (born 5 October 1969) is an Australian politician. He has been an Australian Labor Party member of the Western Australian Legislative Assembly since the 2017 state election, representing Forrestfield.

Price worked as a gold miner and as a union official with the Australian Workers' Union before entering politics.

References

1969 births
Living people
Australian Labor Party members of the Parliament of Western Australia
Members of the Western Australian Legislative Assembly
21st-century Australian politicians